The 1954 Connecticut Huskies football team represented the University of Connecticut in the 1954 college football season.  The Huskies were led by third year head coach Bob Ingalls, and completed the season with a record of 1–8.

Schedule

References

Connecticut
UConn Huskies football seasons
Connecticut Huskies football